Walter W. Stewart (1885 — 1958) was an American economist and banking expert. He was an economics advisor to four presidents, Coolidge, Hoover, Roosevelt and Eisenhower.

Education and career
Stewart graduated Phi Beta Kappa from the University of Missouri in 1909.  He was a professor of economics at the University of Missouri, the University of Michigan and Amherst College.  He joined the faculty of the School of Economics and Politics at the Institute for Advanced Study (IAS) on September 1, 1938 and remained there until his death in 1958.

In 1922 Stewart joined the Federal Reserve Board as Director of Research where he served as a mentor to Emanuel Goldenweiser and built a bridge between the statistics division and central bank policy.

He was an economic advisor to the Bank of England from 1928 to 1930, the first American to serve in that capacity.

During World War II members of the IAS School of Economics and Politics did important war work.  In 1944 Stewart along with IAS colleague Robert B. Warren worked for the Treasury Department in Washington, advising them on the relation between fiscal operations and the banking system.  He served on President Dwight D. Eisenhower’s Council of Economic Advisers from 1953 to 1955.

In 1927 he was elected as a Fellow of the American Statistical Association.

References

External links
  Home page of Walter Stewart at The Institute for Advanced Study

20th-century American economists
Institute for Advanced Study faculty
University of Michigan faculty
Amherst College faculty
Fellows of the American Statistical Association
Trustees of the Institute for Advanced Study
University of Missouri alumni
1885 births
1958 deaths
United States Council of Economic Advisers